Ananthagiri mandal is one of the 23 mandals in Suryapet district of the Indian state of Telangana. It is under the administration of Kodad revenue division with its headquarters at Ananthagiri. It is carved out from Kodad and Nadigudem mandals. It is bounded by Nadigudem in the west , Kodad mandal in the south and Khammam district towards north.

Demographics
Ananthagiri mandal has a population of 29,155.

Villages 
The mandal has 10 settlements.
The settlements in the mandal are listed below:

Notes
(†) Mandal headquarter

References

Mandals in Suryapet district